Charles Wieder Dent (born May 24, 1960) is an American politician who served as a Republican member of the United States House of Representatives for  from 2005 to 2018.

Born in Allentown, Pennsylvania, Dent worked in a variety of occupations after graduating from Pennsylvania State University. He earned a master's degree in public administration from Lehigh University and served as an aide to Congressman Donald L. Ritter. From 1991 to 2004, he served in the Pennsylvania General Assembly. In 2004, Dent won election to the United States House of Representatives, succeeding Pat Toomey.

In the House, Dent became a member of the centrist Republican Main Street Partnership and the Tuesday Group. He became co-chair of the Tuesday Group in 2007. He served on the House Committee on Appropriations, and previously chaired the House Ethics Committee.

In September 2017, Dent announced that he would retire from Congress and not seek re-election to another term in 2018.  In April 2018, Dent announced that he would retire in May 2018, not serving out the remainder of his term. He resigned on May 12, 2018, leaving the seat vacant.

Early life, education, and early career
Dent was born and raised in Allentown, Pennsylvania, the son of Marjorie L. (née Wieder) and Walter R. Dent. He is of German, English, and Irish descent. Dent is a 1978 graduate of Allentown's William Allen High School. He received a bachelor's in international politics from Pennsylvania State University in 1982 and a masters in public administration from Lehigh University in 1993. He is a member of Phi Kappa Psi, and previously worked as a development officer for Lehigh University, an industrial electronics salesman, a hotel clerk, and an aide to U.S. Representative Donald L. Ritter.

Pennsylvania legislature
Before being elected to the United States Congress, Dent was a member of the State Legislature for 14 years. He represented Pennsylvania's 132nd house district from 1991 to 1999 after unseating Democratic incumbent Jack Pressman in a heavily Democratic district in 1990.

In 1998, Dent won an open 16th District Senate seat when Democrat Roy Afflerbach (who later served as Mayor of Allentown from 2002 to 2006) retired to take up an ultimately unsuccessful bid for Congress.

U.S. House of Representatives

Elections
2004
Dent was elected to the United States House of Representatives in 2004, succeeding Pat Toomey, who gave up his seat to challenge Arlen Specter for the U.S. Senate. He defeated Democrat Joe Driscoll 59%–39%.

2006

He won re-election 54%–44% against Charles Dertinger.

2008

He won re-election 59%–41% against Allentown Democratic Party Chairman Sam Bennett.

2010

Dent won re-election against Bethlehem Mayor John Callahan with 54% of the vote, the smallest percent of the vote he received in any of his election campaigns.

2012

Dent defeated Democrat Rick Daugherty, the Chairman of the Lehigh County Democratic Party, 57%–43%.

2014

Dent won re-election unopposed.

2016

Dent defeated Daugherty in a rematch, 58%–38%.

Tenure

Dent is a moderate Republican. The non-partisan National Journal gave Dent a composite ideological rating of 62% conservative and 38% liberal in 2013. The National Journal considered Dent to be one of the three most moderate Republicans in that year. GovTrack placed Dent near the ideological center of the House of Representatives; the liberal American Civil Liberties Union gave him a rating of 35% and the fiscally conservative United States Chamber of Commerce gave him a 95% rating. Dent was ranked as the 47th most bipartisan member of the U.S. House of Representatives during the 114th United States Congress (and the fourth most bipartisan member of the U.S. House of Representatives from Pennsylvania) in the Bipartisan Index created by The Lugar Center and the McCourt School of Public Policy that ranks members of the United States Congress by their degree of bipartisanship (by measuring the frequency each member's bills attract co-sponsors from the opposite party and each member's co-sponsorship of bills by members of the opposite party).

In 2014, Dent introduced a bill to give states more flexibility in how they provide health insurance to children from families between 100 and 133 percent of the federal poverty level, according to The Ripon Advance.

The Next Generation Choices Foundation selected Dent to be the Elsie Hillman Speaker at their annual National Cancer Prevention Day event in 2016 in recognition of his efforts to support legislation related to cancer prevention.

Before retiring, Dent voted in line with President Trump's position on legislation 93% of the time. After announcing his retirement during late 2017, he said that dealing with the "freewheeling president" became "exhausting". According to The Hill, he said "disorder, chaos, instability, uncertainty, intemperate statements" were not "conservative virtues". He delivered a farewell speech on May 10, and resigned on May 12, 2018, leaving the seat vacant.

Political positions

Social policy
In April 2011, after admitting that it was highly controversial, Dent voted along with the other Republican members of the House for a budget bill that would have abolished government-run Medicare. It proposed to make senior citizens purchase individual private health insurance using vouchers that would have covered only a part of their costs. The Congressional Budget Office found that privatizing Medicare under this plan would significantly increase the out-of-pocket costs to seniors; by 2030, the out-of-pocket share for standard medical expenses paid by a typical 65-year-old would have risen to 68% under the Republican plan, as opposed to 25% under the then existing Medicare system. The CBO found that the Republican bill would also have increased the budget deficit for at least a decade.

Dent voted against the 2007 Re-authorization of the Children's Health Insurance Program (CHIP). Dent consistently opposed the Affordable Care Act, commonly known as Obamacare. However he broke with his party and voted against one of the Republican attempts to repeal Obamacare in 2017.

As a Republican who represented a district with Democratic leanings, he occasionally crossed party lines on legislation. On the issue of abortion and reproductive health care, Dent is a pro-choice Republican. In 2018, Planned Parenthood, which supports legal access to abortion and birth control, gave Dent a 41% lifetime score for voting with their positions and the anti-abortion National Right to Life Committee, which opposes legal abortion, gave him a 50% rating in the same year. He co-sponsored legislation to fund embryonic stem-cell research and was one of the Republicans who broke with their party to support the use of embryos in research. Dent supported same-sex marriage. He cosponsored the Employment Non-Discrimination Act which would have banned employment discrimination based on sexual orientation and he voted to allow foreign same-sex partners to receive green cards. The Human Rights Campaign, which supports same-sex marriage and LGBT rights, gave him a 68% for their legislative scorecard. In December 2010, Dent was one of fifteen Republican House members to vote in favor of repealing the United States military's "Don't Ask, Don't Tell" ban on openly gay service members.

Citizenship and immigration
In April 2010, Dent introduced a resolution urging the U.S. State Department to issue a Certificate of Loss of Nationality to Anwar al-Awlaki. He said al-Awlaki "preaches a culture of hate" and had been a functioning member of al-Qaeda "since before 9/11", and had effectively renounced his U.S. citizenship by engaging in treasonous acts. Anwar al-Awlaki was killed in a U.S. drone strike in Yemen on September 30, 2011, and his 16-year-old son, Abdulrahman was likewise killed two weeks later; both strikes were ordered by U.S. President Barack Obama. Al-Awlaki's eight-year-daughter Nawar, also a U.S. citizen, was killed in a SEAL commando raid in Yemen on January 29, 2017. The raid was ordered by President Donald Trump. In it, a SEAL was killed and an Osprey aircraft was destroyed.

In January 2012, Dent co-sponsored the Enemy Expatriation Act with Senator Joe Lieberman. The bill's purpose was "To add engaging in or supporting hostilities against the United States to the list of acts for which United States nationals would lose their nationality," where the term "hostilities" means any conflict subject to the laws of war. The proposal would allow the United States government to strip U.S. citizens of their citizenship without requiring that the citizen have been convicted of a crime.

Dent criticized President Donald Trump's 2017 executive order to temporarily curtail Muslim immigration until better screening methods were devised. He stated that "This is ridiculous. I guess I understand what his intention is, but unfortunately the order appears to have been rushed through without full consideration. You know, there are many, many nuances of immigration policy that can be life or death for many innocent, vulnerable people around the world."

Economy
In 2005, Dent cosponsored H.R. 4411, the Goodlatte-Leach Internet Gambling Prohibition Act. Dent stated in 2018 that he would "tuck" his Export-Import Bank bill into the spending bill as an omnibus. The bill would "lower the quorum on the board so it could approve large loans once more." As of 2018, the reopened bank had a seven-member board that lacked a quorum.

Education
At the start of the 112th Congress, Dent received a new position on the coveted House Appropriations Committee, and continued to serve on the House Ethics Committee. In June 2013, Dent decided to co-sponsor the Safe Schools Improvement Act (SSIA), a bill that would require schools and districts to adopt policies specifically prohibiting bullying and harassment against all students, including LGBT young people. Dent is known for his efforts to promote LGBT equality throughout the nation.

Energy
Dent is a proponent of hydrogen fuel and was one of the four founding members of the House Hydrogen Fuel Cell Caucus. In 2006, he proposed legislation aimed at promoting the rollout of commercial hydrogen fueling stations. He has spoken of his vision for the development of a "Hydrogen Highway East", similar to California Governor Arnold Schwarzenegger's plans for a Hydrogen Highway on the West Coast. Dent is a member of The Republican Main Street Partnership. In 2007 he was elected to co-chair the Tuesday Group, a centrist organization of Congressional Republicans.

Drug policy
Dent is a proponent of drug prohibition, and is outspoken on the dangers of novel synthetic drugs, having personally sponsored several bills aimed to schedule new psychoactive compounds. In 2011, he sponsored the Synthetic Drug Control Act of 2011, which sought to schedule a large number of cannabimimetic agents, as well as 26 other psychoactive substances. The bill passed the House but did not make its way through the Senate. On March 27, 2017, the bill was re-introduced as the Synthetic Drug Control Act of 2017. If passed in its current text (as of May 14, 2017), this bill would schedule a large number of novel psychoactive substances, including 96 phenethylamines, 94 cannabimimetic agents, 15 arylcyclohexylamines, 21 tryptamines, 8 benzylpiperazines, 4 benzodiazepines, 4 opioid or opioid-like substances, 8 piperazines, and 2 tropane alkaloids.

Committee assignments
 Committee on Appropriations
 Chairman, United States House Appropriations Subcommittee on Military Construction, Veterans Affairs, and Related Agencies
 Vice Chairman, United States House Appropriations Subcommittee on State, Foreign Operations, and Related Programs
 United States House Appropriations Subcommittee on Labor, Health and Human Services, Education, and Related Agencies
 Chairman United States House Committee on Ethics

Caucus memberships
 Congressional Arts Caucus
 Congressional Cement Caucus, Co-Chair
U.S.-Japan Caucus
Friends of Wales Caucus
Problem Solvers Caucus

Electoral history

|-
| colspan=13 |
|-
!Year
!Winning candidate
!Party
!Pct
!Opponent
!Party
!Pct
!Opponent
!Party
!Pct
!Opponent
!Party
!Pct
|-
|2004
| style="background:#ffb3b3;"| Charlie Dent
| style="background:#ffb3b3;"|Republican
| style="background:#ffb3b3;"| 59%
| style="background:#b3d9ff;"| Joe Driscoll
| style="background:#b3d9ff;"|Democratic
| style="background:#b3d9ff;"| 39%
| style="background:#fc9;"|Richard J. Piotrowski
| style="background:#fc9;"|Libertarian
| style="background:#fc9;"| 1%
| style="background:#0bda51;"|Greta Browne
| style="background:#0bda51;"|Green Party
| style="background:#0bda51;"| 1%
|-
|2006
| style="background:#ffb3b3;"| Charlie Dent (inc.)
| style="background:#ffb3b3;"|Republican
| style="background:#ffb3b3;"| 54%
| style="background:#b3d9ff;"| Charles Dertinger
| style="background:#b3d9ff;"|Democratic
| style="background:#b3d9ff;"| 43%
|
|
|
| style="background:#0bda51;"|Greta Browne
| style="background:#0bda51;"|Green Party
| style="background:#0bda51;"| 3%
|-
|2008
| style="background:#ffb3b3;"| Charlie Dent (inc.)
| style="background:#ffb3b3;"|Republican
| style="background:#ffb3b3;"| 59%
| style="background:#b3d9ff;"| Sam Bennett
| style="background:#b3d9ff;"|Democratic
| style="background:#b3d9ff;"| 41%
|-
||2010
| style="background:#ffb3b3;"| Charlie Dent (inc.)
| style="background:#ffb3b3;"|Republican
| style="background:#ffb3b3;"| 54%
| style="background:#b3d9ff;"| John Callahan
| style="background:#b3d9ff;"|Democratic
| style="background:#b3d9ff;"| 39%
| style="background:#ccc;"| Jake Towne
| style="background:#ccc;"|Independent
| style="background:#ccc;"| 7%
|-
||2012
| style="background:#ffb3b3;"| Charlie Dent (inc.)
| style="background:#ffb3b3;"|Republican
| style="background:#ffb3b3;"| 57%
| style="background:#b3d9ff;"| Rick Daugherty
| style="background:#b3d9ff;"|Democratic
| style="background:#b3d9ff;"| 43%
|-
||2014
| style="background:#ffb3b3;"| Charlie Dent (inc.)
| style="background:#ffb3b3;"|Republican
| style="background:#ffb3b3;"| 100%
| style="background:#b3d9ff;"|
| style="background:#b3d9ff;"|
| style="background:#b3d9ff;"|
|-
||2016
| style="background:#ffb3b3;"| Charlie Dent (inc.)
| style="background:#ffb3b3;"|Republican
| style="background:#ffb3b3;"| 58%
| style="background:#b3d9ff;"| Rick Daugherty
| style="background:#b3d9ff;"|Democratic
| style="background:#b3d9ff;"| 38%
| style="background:#fc9;"| Paul Rizzo
| style="background:#fc9;"|Libertarian
| style="background:#fc9;"| 4%

Post-political career
Following his resignation from Congress, Dent joined the law firm DLA Piper as a non-attorney policy adviser. He registered as a lobbyist following the mandatory one-year cooling off period.

On August 19, 2020, Dent announced his formal endorsement of Joe Biden, the Democratic nominee for the 2020 presidential election, joining other Republicans such as Colin Powell, John Kasich, Christine Todd Whitman, Jeff Flake, Chuck Hagel, Susan Molinari and John Warner in choosing to vote for the Democrat in the election.

On July 6, 2022, Dent endorsed Democrat Josh Shapiro in the Pennsylvania Governor Election, claiming that Shapiro would 'unite the state' and that Mastriano 'is a threat to the rule of law'.

Personal life
Dent is married to Pamela Jane Serfass and has three children.

References

External links

 
 

|-

|-

|-

|-

|-

1960 births
20th-century American politicians
21st-century American politicians
American people of English descent
American people of German descent
American people of Irish descent
American Presbyterians
Articles containing video clips
Lehigh University alumni
Living people
Republican Party members of the Pennsylvania House of Representatives
Republican Party Pennsylvania state senators
Pennsylvania State University alumni
Politicians from Allentown, Pennsylvania
Republican Party members of the United States House of Representatives from Pennsylvania
William Allen High School alumni